This is a list of notable alumni and faculty of the University of Mysore.

Notable faculty

Notable alumni

Arts

Business

Humanities and Social Sciences

Law

Politics

Science and Technology

Sports

References

Notes

Citations 

Mysore
University of Mysore